Animal Aid is a British animal rights organisation, founded in 1977 by Jean Pink. The group campaigns peacefully against the consumption of animals as food and against animal cruelty such as their use for medical research—and promotes a cruelty-free lifestyle. It also investigates and exposes animal abuse.

Animal Aid conducts undercover investigations, produces campaign reports, leaflets and fact files, as well as educational videos and other resources. They also offer a quarterly magazine and a sales catalogue with vegan and cruelty-free products.

Aims and objectives
Animal Aid was founded in January 1977 to work, by all peaceful means, for an end to animal cruelty. The organization is a not-for-profit limited company run by a volunteer council of management. It has not applied to be a charity so that it is able to use its funds for sometimes controversial campaigns. Its aims are:
 
 To increase public awareness of the abuse of animals in our society, particularly in vivisection laboratories and factory farms and to educate public opinion to demand, by all lawful means, the abolition of all experiments on animals, factory farming and all other forms of animal abuse.
 To examine existing legislation on matters associated with the above objectives or related aspects and to promote social, legal and administrative reforms in furtherance of the above objectives.
 To prevent exploitation of animals.
 To educate the public and particularly young people with a sense of moral responsibility towards animals.
 To promote, generally, a lifestyle which does not involve the abuse of animals.
 To collect, and diffuse among members and the public generally, information on all matters affecting the above objectives and with a view there to print, issue and circulate papers, periodicals, books, circulars and other literary matter and produce film and audio-visual material, and to promote, sponsor, procure or assist in any way, courses or lectures or other instructions in furtherance of such objectives.

Celebrity supporters
Animal Aid's current patrons are Peter Egan, Sara Pascoe, Carol Royle, Peter Tatchell and Wendy Turner Webster.  It has other celebrity supporters, including Chris Packham, Deborah Meaden,  Thom Yorke, Stella McCartney, Richard Wilson, Massive Attack, Alexei Sayle, Benjamin Zephaniah, Martin Shaw, Chrissie Hynde, Alan Davies and the Reverend Professor Andrew Linzey. Patrons and supporters now deceased have included Watership Down author Richard Adams, Tony Benn and comedian Spike Milligan. 

Dr Charlotte Uhlenbroek, the primatologist, has supported the Animal Aid campaign against primate experiments, stating: "I have yet to hear a sufficiently compelling scientific argument that justifies the suffering inflicted on primates in medical research."

BBC TV Springwatch's Michaela Strachan presented Animal Aid's Animal Kind series of short curriculum-based educational films.

Campaigns
Animal Aid campaigns include:
 Wildlife: Animal Aid campaigns against wildlife culls, including the culling of badgers, wild boar, grey squirrels and pigeons. It has opposed shooting and the use of traps, snares and poisons in the name of conservation, and "calls for tolerance, for compassion and a willingness to concede space to the natural world". It has produced information and advice sheets on humanely deterring unwanted wildlife, including the use of non-lethal methods. In 2021 Animal Aid launched a campaign to ban the manufacture, sale, possession and use of snares in the UK. The campaign presents footage of snares causing extreme suffering to animals, the failure of the 'Code of Best Practice', and the fact that in 2016 a majority of MPs voted for an outright ban. In March 2022 Animal Aid's UK Parliament petition to ban snares reached over 100,000 signatures, triggering a parliamentary debate. 
 Animal farming: Animal Aid campaigns against factory farming. It exposes animal suffering in UK intensive farming systems as well as in 'high welfare' rearing systems, such as RSPCA Assured or free-range. It conducts undercover investigations with footage documenting animal suffering, overcrowding and poor conditions on UK farms. This has included farms winning Farmer of the Year awards, free-range and RSPCA Assured farms. Investigations have exposed the suffering of meat chickens, egg-laying hens, turkeys, pigs, cows and goats. Animal Aid highlights and objects to planning proposals for new intensive farms. In 2021 this included rabbit meat and fur farms. It also campaigns against the suffering of fish and environmental damage caused by the fishing industry.
 Slaughter: Animal Aid uses hidden cameras to film in UK slaughterhouses. It has filmed inside sixteen British slaughterhouses, finding evidence of lawbreaking in most of them. Its films have revealed widespread and serious problems, including many cases of deliberate cruelty. It also found breaches of welfare laws at slaughterhouses used by 'high welfare' accredited standards, including organic and RSPCA Assured. Even where no laws were broken, it has found animals suffering pain and fear. Following Animal Aid's CCTV campaign, all the major supermarket chains agreed to insist that their suppliers fit CCTV cameras in their slaughterhouses. Animal Aid campaigns for mandatory independently monitored CCTV in all UK slaughterhouses. Although this has now happened in England and Scotland, it continues to campaign for mandatory CCTV in Wales and Northern Ireland.
 Animal experiments: Animal Aid campaigns against animal experimentation on both moral and scientific grounds. It highlights the scale of animal experimentation in the UK: that around 4 million animals are experimented on in British laboratories each year, and that around every 8 seconds one animal dies. It also publicises that, as well as rats and mice, a wide range of animals are experimented on, including cats, dogs, guinea pigs, rabbits and monkeys. It champions the increasing potential of humane, non-animal research, including test tube (in vitro) and computer (in silico) based methods, and points to documented failures of the animal model, questioning its viability. Victims of Charity: This campaign aims to persuade medical research charities to stop funding animal experiments and to use methods such as epidemiological studies; in vitro research using human cell and tissue cultures; clinical studies; human autopsy examinations; computerised patient-drug databases and post-marketing surveillance; mathematical models and computer simulations and non-invasive imaging techniques. Since the launch of the campaign, two major charities have committed to stop funding animal research. Animal Aid publishes a list of UK health charities indicating their animal research status - whether or not each charity funds or conducts animal research. Animal Aid campaigns to stop warfare experiments on animals. In the UK these are conducted by the Ministry of Defence's  Defence Science and Technology Laboratory (Dstl) at Porton Down.  These experiments, conducted on thousands of animals each year, include the use of nerve agents, chemical or biological weapons and the simulation of blast injury. Examples include shooting rodents in the eyes, applying nerve agents to guinea pigs and infecting monkeys with Ebola. In 2020 Animal Aid coordinated an open letter to the UK Government, signed by a number of animal advocacy organisations, public figures, parliamentarians and over 8000 individuals, calling for a ban on the use of animals in warfare experiments. It also campaigned for MPs to support an Early Day Motion calling for a ban, which 100 MPs signed.
 Horse racing: This aims for an end to commercial horse racing, and as a first step, a ban on the use of the whip except for safety purposes. Whip regulations have been somewhat tightened up since the launch of the campaign. Animal Aid's undercover investigation into horse slaughter revealed video evidence of practices and conditions in UK abattoirs providing horsemeat for human consumption abroad. This included former race industry horses. The investigation was featured in a 2021 BBC Panorama programme, The Dark Side of Horse Racing. Later that year the British Horseracing Authority (BHA) announced that it would not permit the sale of race horses to abattoirs to be slaughtered for meat. Race Horse Death Watch is Animal Aid’s online database that records thoroughbred deaths on British racecourses. In March 2022 Animal Aid launched the Irish Horse Death Watch website which lists all horses killed due to racing on racecourses in the Republic of Ireland and Northern Ireland.
 Game bird shooting: Animal Aid campaigns for an end to the production and shooting of animals for pleasure. Some 50 million pheasants and partridges are intensively farmed every year so that they can be released and shot for sport. In 2010, the outgoing Labour government was about to ban the metal battery cages in which thousands of egg-producing pheasants and partridges are confined to their productive lives. But this was overturned by the incoming Coalition government. Animal Aid continues its campaign for the cages to be outlawed.
 Veganism: Animal Aid promotes a cruelty-free diet, provides free cookery demonstrations in schools, and sends out free information packs and other literature. A central feature of the campaign is the Great Vegan Challenge, which is staged every November.
 Living without cruelty: Animal Aid promotes a cruelty-free lifestyle, encouraging people to help end animal suffering through ordinary, everyday decisions which choose compassion over cruelty. It focuses on clothing, cosmetics, toiletries and household products, such as cleaning materials and duvets. Animal Aid discourages participation in sport and leisure activities which kill animals or cause animal suffering. It exposes animal suffering in the pet trade, and recommends adopting companion animals from rescue centres, sanctuaries or shelters rather than buying them from pet shops or breeders. It also encourages people not to buy exotic pets.

Christmas Fayre 

Animal Aid's Christmas Festival is held every year, early in December, in London, England, to promote a cruelty-free lifestyle.

There are goods for sale including fair trade crafts and jewellery, cruelty-free cosmetics, recycled goods, environmentally friendly clothing, non-leather boots and shoes and seasonal cards and gifts. There is a lecture programme throughout the day, plus a wide variety of vegan food. It is promoted as a family event.

There is also an annual South West Christmas Without Cruelty Fayre held in Exeter, England.

See also 
Animal ethics
List of animal rights groups

References

External links

1977 establishments in the United Kingdom
Animal rights organizations
Animal welfare organisations based in the United Kingdom
Organizations established in 1977